Jodhpur National University (JNU) is a state private college established by the state government under the Private Universities Act. The University is located in the suburbs of Jodhpur and is housed on a 30-acre campus. The university has more than 13,000 students. It was established by the Government of Rajasthan under Section 2(f) of the UGC Act, 1956, as a private, state university. The university offer a variety of courses.

Academics
Courses available with Jodhpur National University:

Facilities

Library

The University library has about 90,000 books in all core, functional and applied areas of study.

Extra-Curricular(Cats)

The campus provides space and opportunities for various indoor and outdoor games such as cricket, football, basketball, badminton, volleyball, aerobics, etc.

Hospital

A hospital with over 250 beds and diagnostic facilities such as X-ray, blood tests, ECG, etc.

Bank

A branch of Bank of Rajasthan Ltd. on the University campus with ATM Places is available to students.

Transport

University has its own fleet of busses, cars and vans for transporting staff and students.

Accommodation

The University offers separate accommodations for boys and girls.

"Job Fair"
Jodhpur National University has been organizing a job fair every year since 2010 with the vision of "Making India Employable" via Dream Endurance. More than 2000 students from different parts of India are recruited through the university's job fair.

References

External links 
 Official Website

Private universities in India
Universities in Jodhpur
Educational institutions established in 2008
2008 establishments in Rajasthan